Svēte Manor is a manor house in Svēte parish in the historical region of Zemgale, in Latvia.

History 
The manor was originally built around 1730, and extensively remodeled with new columns between 1774 and 1775 by architect Severin Jensen for use as a summer vacation residence by Duke Peter von Biron. The building was part of an army base between 1870 and 1993. It was further remodeled between 1876 and 1878 for military use.

See also
List of palaces and manor houses in Latvia

References

Manor houses in Latvia
Jelgava Municipality